Ki Dar-e Pain (also Romanized as Kī Dar-e Pā’īn; also known as Kī Dar and Kīdar) is a village in Piveshk Rural District, Lirdaf District, Jask County, Hormozgan Province, Iran. At the 2006 census, its population was 156, in 43 families.

References 

Populated places in Jask County